Sweedlin is an unincorporated community located in the north-east of Pendleton County, West Virginia, United States.

References 

Unincorporated communities in West Virginia
Unincorporated communities in Pendleton County, West Virginia